Gascue is a Sector in the city of Santo Domingo in the Distrito Nacional of the Dominican Republic, one of the oldest of the city.

This borough is populated in particular by individuals from the upper middle class; however, it was originally an upper class neighborhood.

It has the headquarters of the Junta de Aviación Civil and the Comisión Investigadora de Accidentes de Aviación.

References 
http://www.listindiario.com/la-vida/2013/10/17/296093/alerta-gazcue-une-arquitectura-y-fotografia

External links 

Distrito Nacional sectors  

Geography of Santo Domingo